Lakelands is a residential suburb of the City of Lake Macquarie, New South Wales, Australia   south-west of Newcastle's central business district near the northern end of Lake Macquarie. It is part of the City of Lake Macquarie west ward, and was formerly part of Warners Bay.

Along Ambleside Circuit, the suburb's main street, is "Lakelands Business Centre". There is a variety of small businesses including a cafe, barber and psychiatrist. There is a tennis court, playground and also a cricket field in the south of Lakelands.

In 2015, Lakelands was expanded into a former bush area, adding a residential area to the west of the suburb, bordering Warners Bay.

References

External links
 History of Lakelands (Lake Macquarie City Library)

Suburbs of Lake Macquarie